Slaughtered Vomit Dolls is a 2006 Canadian surrealist exploitation psychological horror film written and directed by Lucifer Valentine who coined "vomit gore" as a new subgenre. The film had a simultaneous DVD and limited theatrical release on February 14, 2006. The film follows a very loose plot structure, consisting of assorted random scenes mostly revolving around Angela Aberdeen, a bulimic stripper-turned-prostitute.

Slaughtered Vomit Dolls is a part of the Vomit Gore Trilogy and was followed by two sequels: ReGOREgitated Sacrifice (2008) and Slow Torture Puke Chamber (2010).  A fourth "Vomit Gore" film - titled Vomit Gore 4: Black Mass of the Nazi Sex Wizard - was released in 2015. Most recently, in May 2020, an anthology film titled "The Angela Chapters" was released.

Synopsis
Angela Aberdeen (Ameara LaVey) is a teenage runaway that suffers from bulimia. In order to make ends meet, she begins working as a prostitute. As her bulimia worsens, Angela begins to experience a series of hallucinations where she experiences visions of the deaths of her fellow strippers as well 
as various others.

Reception
JoBlo.com panned Slaughtered Vomit Dolls overall, saying that while they were curious to see what the director could do next, the film "ultimately fails to either entertain, shock, or put forth any novel ideas." HorrorNews.net also gave a negative review, criticizing the film and stating that "If you need a movie to have some form of a linear story, don’t bother with this one. If you are tired of seeing women constantly berated and insulted and shown as weak and scared, don’t bother with this one. And if vomit isn’t your thing, yeah, definitely don’t bother with this one." DVD Talk reviewed the trilogy as a whole and gave it a mostly positive review, saying that the films would not appeal to every viewer and that "for horror fans who want something different, something that mixes up art and sex and violence and gore and surrealism and who don't mind the confrontational nature of Valentine's work, this set is worth seeking out."

References

External links 
 
 

Films about Satanism
Vomiting
2006 direct-to-video films
American direct-to-video films
Canadian direct-to-video films
2000s exploitation films
American splatter films
2006 horror films
Canadian independent films
American sexploitation films
Canadian splatter films
English-language Canadian films
Films shot in Vancouver
Films about prostitution in Canada
Direct-to-video horror films
American avant-garde and experimental films
Canadian avant-garde and experimental films
Obscenity controversies in film
2000s avant-garde and experimental films
2006 directorial debut films
2006 films
2000s English-language films
2000s American films
2000s Canadian films
Canadian sexploitation films